Trần Ngọc Lan Khuê (born 4 January 1992 in Ho Chi Minh City) is a Vietnamese supermodel, judge programs and beauty queen. Lan Khue rose to prominence in 2013 as she won the Gold award in the Vietnam supermodel contest in 2013, and became one of the most sought-after models in Vietnam. In 2014, she joined the Miss Aodai Vietnam (the previous name of Miss World Vietnam) pageant and won title. Then, she represented Vietnam in Miss World 2015 and was placed top 11. She shoot to fame when she got invited as one of 3 mentors in the reality show The Face Vietnam.

Trần Ngọc Lan Khuê is the ambassador of L'Oréal, UFC gym and Salonpas in Vietnam. She is now the CEO of Elite model management in Ho Chi Minh City, Vietnam.

Early life 
Trần Ngọc Lan Khuê was born on 4 January 1992 in Ho Chi Minh City, Vietnam. She come from a family with a strong academic background, both of her parents are professors in Ho Chi Minh City Pedagogical University. Her grandfather, The late Professor Tran Thanh Dam, was the first chairman of Ho Chi Minh City Pedagogical University.

Trần Ngọc Lan Khuê grew up and proved to be a brilliant student with an outstanding school record.  After graduating from high school, Lan Khue got accepted into Ho Chi Minh City University of Social Sciences and Humanities, major in German language and Literature. As an only child, her upbringing was filled with full of expectation from her family, she was set to follow her family's academic footstep however her life got a significant change when she was 19 as a modeling opportunity came up. Lan Khue then started working as a model considering it was a part-time job, but the love and desire to become a professional model became stronger with each photoshoot and each catwalk on the runway. Due to her family's strict background, she had to put much effort to get the permission to follow her dream. Her mother only gave her a year to challenge for modeling to see if she could survive and develop a career in the entertainment circle. All her effort was paid off with many modeling and fashion awards both from Vietnam and Asia including the Gold award of Vietnam supermodel contest 2013. She has gained the support from her family since then...

Career

2011: before career beginnings 
With a suggestion from her mom's friend, Lan Khue started to try out for modeling. Her first attempt was to join the Vietnam Supermodel contest in 2011, however she got fallen on her knee on the casting round which made her unable to continue the contest.

2012–2013: beginning career with contests 
In 2012, Lan Khue came back in Vietnam Supermodel 2012 which was hold in Hanoi and won the most potential model award. She then competed in Asian Supermodel contest which took place in Nanning, China and reached the rank of second runner-up, she also won the photogenic award.

She participated in the New Silk Road Model Look contest in Clark, Philippines. She was placed first runner-up in the final, the winner was from China, and the second runner-up was from Thailand.

Later, Khuê once again competed in the Vietnam Supermodel 2013 and became the winner on 20 October.

2014–2015: competing in beauty pageants and other activities 
Early 2014, Film director Trương Quang Thịnh chose her as a singer named Trang Nhi in his new movie Handsome Sơn which was aired in early 2015.

In September, Khuê participated in Miss Aodai Vietnam 2014 which is a pageant held to find the representative of Vietnam for Miss World 2015, she won the crown on 5 January 2015 with Confidently Shining Award.

On November, Lan Khue flew to Sanya, China and represented Vietnam at Miss World 2015. In the final, Lan Khue was excellently placed among the top 11 finalists at Miss World pageant by winning People's Choice Award. It is known as one of the two best achievements of Vietnam at this beauty pageant.

Opportunity for being a MC reached Lan Khue and she was MC for Thay lời muốn nói (which is a live broadcast on Lunar New year eve on ANTV) and the final of Vietnam Supermodel 2015.

2016: The Face Vietnam and becoming CEO of Elite Model 
On 2 April, Nawat Itsaragrisil who is the president of Miss Grand International pageant with the newly crowned Miss Grand Claire Elizabeth Parker arrived in Vietnam. They invited Khuê to represent Vietnam at his pageant. However, due to her already-in-progress plans, she gave the opportunity to the first runner-up of Miss Aodai Vietnam 2016 and became the national director of Miss Grand International Vietnam.

On 23 April, Lan Khue was announced as one of 3 mentors of The Face Vietnam 2016 which is hosted by Vĩnh Thụy, the other mentors were Hồ Ngọc Hà, Phạm Hương.

On 15 November, Khuê was selected as CEO of Elite model management in Hồ Chí Minh City, Vietnam.

Khuê became the first representative of L'Oreal Paris in Vietnam, she also became one of the two representatives for UFC gym in Vietnam.

2017: The Face Vietnam 
In April, Khuê went to Osaka, Japan in a culture exchange festival
On 17 April, the three mentors of The Face Vietnam season 2 were official announced including Lan Khuê, Minh Tú and Hoàng Thùy. The official press conference was taken place on 23 May 2017. The official poster also are publicized on the same day. After 12 episodes, the Final Walk was taken place on 27 August and the winner is Tú Hảo who belongs to her team, with 40.75% of audience vote.

On 18 May, Salonpas Day festival was hold in AEON Mall Tan Phu, Lan Khue was announced as the representative of this brand in Vietnam.

2018: guest mentor for Vietnam Supermodel 
Early 2018, Lan Khuê was announced as the host for Vietnam Supermodel reality show. Also, she is one of the judges for the casting round of reality show The Look (2018)

2021: judge of Miss Charm International 2021 
Miss Charm International 2021 will be held on 11 October 2021 in Ho Chi Minh City, Vietnam.

She was selected by the organizers to be the judge of this contest.

Personal life 
Lan Khue is an artist with good public image, she keeps her personal life quite private.

On 30 June 2018, Lan Khuê was proposed by her boyfriend, John Tuan Nguyen, the wedding would be taken place in October.

Judge

Master of Ceremony

Ambassador

Festival

Brands

Filmography

Movies

Television series

Short film

Title, awards and nominations

Competitions and pageants

Award and nominations

References

External links
Trần Ngọc Lan Khuê on Facebook
Lan Khue official fanpage on Facebook
Lan Khue official Youtube Channel

1992 births
Living people
Vietnamese female models
People from Ho Chi Minh City
Vietnamese film actresses
Miss World 2015 delegates
21st-century Vietnamese women